Baldridge is a surname. Notable people with the surname include:

Adam Baldridge (fl. 1690–1697), English pirate
Brian Baldridge (born 1969), American politician
Cyrus Leroy Baldridge (1889–1977), American artist
Daniel Baldridge (born 1985), American football player
Drew Baldridge (born 1992), American country music singer/songwriter
H. C. Baldridge (1868–1947), governor of Idaho
Jim Baldridge (fl. 1960s–2000s), American newscaster

See also
Baldridge, Indiana, unincorporated community in Indiana, United States
Baldrige

Surnames
Surnames of English origin
Surnames of British Isles origin
English-language surnames